The Warkworth Radio Astronomical Observatory is a radio telescope observatory, located just south of Warkworth, New Zealand, about 50 km north of the Auckland CBD. It is operated by the Institute for Radio Astronomy and Space Research, Auckland University of Technology. The WARK12M 12m Radio Telescope was constructed in 2008. In 2010, a licence to operate the Telecom New Zealand 30m dish was granted, which led to the commissioning of the WARK30M 30m Radio Telescope. The first observations made in conjunction with the Australian Long Baseline Array took place in 2011.

History 

The complex was first developed for long-range telecommunications, operated by the New Zealand Post Office and opening on 17 July 1971. The station, primarily connecting to fourth generation Intelsat satellites, was used for satellite telephone circuits and television, including the broadcast of the 1974 British Commonwealth Games, held in Christchurch. The shallow valley site was chosen as it was sheltered from winds and radio noise, and the horizon elevation of only five degrees allowed the station to be useful for transmissions to low orbit satellites. The original 30-metre antenna was decommissioned on 18 June 2008 and demolished.

A second antenna and station building were opened on 24 July 1984. This was removed from service in November 2010, after which the Auckland University of Technology began using the facility for radio astronomy.

Technical information 
A hydrogen maser is installed on-site to provide the very accurate timing required by VLBI observations. The observatory has a 10Gbit/s connection to the Kiwi Advanced Research and Education Network, providing high speed data transfers for files and e-VLBI as well as linking the site to the global national research and education network architecture.

See also 
 Radio astronomy
 List of radio telescopes

References

Auckland University of Technology
Radio observatories
Astronomy institutes and departments
Astronomical instruments
Astronomical observatories in New Zealand